Dick Simon Racing was a race team owned by racer Dick Simon that competed in the CART Championship Car series from 1983 to 1995 and the Indy Racing League from 1999 to 2001.

CART

The team was founded in 1983 when Simon decided to bring his sponsorship from Vermont American to a new team of his own creation.  He saw an immediate boost in performance as he qualified for the Indianapolis 500 for the first time since 1980 and was noticeably more competitive than he was with the Leader Card team.  In 1985 Simon brought in Brazilian Raul Boesel to drive full-time as he scaled back his own racing to a part-time schedule, occasionally joining Boesel in a second car.  Simon only competed in four races in 1986 as Boesel drove the team's primary car to 17th in points and was competitive in nearly every race.  A number of other drivers made part-time appearances in Simon's other entry as Dick Simon Racing became one of the premier teams for pay drivers. This trend continued in 1988 which would be Simon's final year of racing as Arie Luyendyk replaced Boesel in the team's full-time entry.  In 1989 Scott Brayton joined Luyendyk as the team fielded a pair of full-time fully funded entries for the first time.  Luyendyk finished 10th in points while Brayton finished 15th.  Luyendyk left the team for 1990 and was replaced by Japanese rookie Hiro Matsushita while Brayton again finished 15th.  Matsushita took his Panasonic funding elsewhere for 1991, leaving Brayton to drive a single Simon entry to a respectable 12th-place points finish.  Brayton, Matsushita, and Boesel returned to the team in 1992 and Boesel finished 9th in the championship while Brayton finished 15th again.  The team also fielded a car in the Indy 500 for female rookie Lyn St. James who became the second woman to compete in the race. St. James returned for a partial schedule in 1993 while Brayton and Boesel drove the full-time cars to 15th and 5th-place points finishes respectively, with Boesel capturing 3 runner-up finishes.  In 1994 Matsushita again returned to the team as Boesel continued in the other car, this time finishing 7th in points.  In 1995 the team signed Dean Hall and Formula One veteran Eliseo Salazar to drive the team's two cars and they were joined in April by rookie Carlos Guerrero.  Hall left the team after failing to qualify for the Indy 500 while Salazar and Guerrero managed 21st and 30th-place points finishes respectively.

The team finished its years in CART without winning a race, but captured two poles, both by Boesel at the Milwaukee Mile in 1993 and 1994. The team had six second place finishes, one with Arie Luyendyk in 1988, and the rest with Boesel.

As an owner, Simon had a stellar record of his rookie drivers successfully qualifying for the Indy 500. As a tradition, Simon cars frequently made the effort to be "first car(s) on the track" at Indy on the opening day of practice, a popular ceremonial honor.

Indy Racing League

In 1996 Dick Simon sold much of the team's cars and assets to Team Scandia founder Andy Evans and Simon was listed on many of the team's entries in the new Indy Racing League as Simon/Scandia Racing.  It was during that year that Scandia set a race record by having 7 of their cars qualify for the Indianapolis 500.

Dick Simon returned to the IRL in 1999 with Stephan Gregoire who competed in a full schedule but failed to qualify for the Indy 500 and finished 15th in points.  Gregoire returned in 2000 and finished 14th in points and was joined in the Indianapolis 500 by Lyn St. James who began her IndyCar career with Simon 8 years earlier.  Both cars made the race and while St. James wrecked early in the race, Gregoire finished 8th.  Gregoire was set to return for a full season in 2001, but after the team again failed to qualify for the Indy 500, the team shut down in May of that year.

When his own team failed to qualify at the 2001 Indy 500, on race day Simon was hired to be the team strategist for Robby Gordon at A. J. Foyt Enterprises.

NASCAR
At the 1994 Brickyard 400, Dick Simon was the co-owner of Jim Sauter's entry. The car failed to qualify.

Drivers

CART
 Ian Ashley (1986-1987)
 Fulvio Ballabio (1988)
 Raul Boesel (1985-1986, 1992-1994)
 Gary Brabham (1993)
 Scott Brayton (1989-1993)
 Jean-Pierre Frey (1988)
 Philippe Gache (1992)
 Bertrand Gachot (1993)
 Marco Greco (1995)
 Carlos Guerrero (1995)
 Maurício Gugelmin (1993)
 Dean Hall (1995)
 Ludwig Heimrath Jr. (1987)
 Jorge Koechlin (1983)
 Arie Luyendyk (1988-1989, 1995)
 Hideshi Matsuda (1994)
 Hiro Matsushita (1990, 1992, 1994)
 Mike Nish (1984)
 Tero Palmroth (1988-1990)
 Tom Phillips (1986)
 Scott Pruett (1988)
 John Richards (1987)
 Chip Robinson (1986)
 Eliseo Salazar (1995)
 Dick Simon (1983-1988)
 Joe Sposato (1990)
 Lyn St. James (1992-1995)
 Didier Theys (1988)
 Dennis Vitolo (1994)
 Jeff Wood (1987)

IRL
 Michele Alboreto (1996*)
 Racin Gardner (1996*)
 Stephan Gregoire (1999-2001)
 Joe Gosek (1996*)
 Michel Jourdain Jr. (1996*)
 Lyn St. James (1996*, 2000)
 Fermin Velez (1996*)
 Alessandro Zampedri (1996*)

* indicates car was entered as Simon/Scandia Racing

Complete Racing Results

PPG CART Indycar World Series
(key)

Indy Racing League results
(key) (Results in bold indicate pole position; results in italics indicate fastest lap)

 Run in conjunction with Team Scandia.
 The 1999 VisionAire 500K at Charlotte was cancelled after 79 laps due to spectator fatalities.

1983 establishments in the United States
2001 disestablishments in the United States
American auto racing teams
Champ Car teams
IndyCar Series teams
Indy Lights teams